pfSense is a firewall/router computer software distribution based on FreeBSD. The open source pfSense Community Edition (CE) and pfSense Plus is installed on a physical computer or a virtual machine to make a dedicated firewall/router for a network. It can be configured and upgraded through a web-based interface, and requires no knowledge of the underlying FreeBSD system to manage.

Overview
The pfSense project began in 2004 as a fork of the m0n0wall project by Chris Buechler and Scott Ullrich. Its first release was in October 2006. The name derives from the fact that the software uses the packet-filtering tool, PF.

Notable functions of pfSense include traffic shaping, VPNs using IPsec or PPTP, captive portal, stateful firewall, network address translation, 802.1q support for VLANs, and dynamic DNS. pfSense can be installed on hardware with an x86-64 processor architecture. It can also be installed on embedded hardware using Compact Flash or SD cards, or as a virtual machine.

WireGuard protocol support 
In February 2021, pfSense CE 2.5.0 and pfSense Plus 21.02 added support for a kernel WireGuard implementation. Support for WireGuard was temporarily removed in March 2021 after implementation issues were discovered by WireGuard founder Jason Donenfeld. The July 2021 release of pfSense CE 2.5.2 version re-included WireGuard.

See also

 Comparison of firewalls
 List of router and firewall distributions

References

Further reading
 Mastering pfSense, Second Edition Birmingham, UK: Packt Publishing, 2018. . By David Zientra.
 Security: Manage Network Security With pfSense Firewall [Video] Birmingham, UK: Packt, 2018. . By Manuj Aggarwal.

External links
 

2004 software
BSD software
Firewall software
Free routing software
FreeBSD
Gateway/routing/firewall distribution
Operating system distributions bootable from read-only media
Products introduced in 2004
Routers (computing)
Wireless access points